Bolitoglossa xibalba is a lungless salamander in the family Plethodontidae endemic to Guatemala.

References

xibalba
Endemic fauna of Guatemala
Amphibians of Guatemala
Amphibians described in 2010